Ibyka is an extinct genus of Iridopteridales, and a possible ancestor to horsetails.  The name comes from the poet Ibykos because the discovery of the fossil was due to the activity of construction cranes during the construction of the Gilboa Dam. 
The probable relationships within Equisetopsida are shown in the cladogram below.  The position where Ibyka would be added.

References

Ferns
Devonian plants
Prehistoric plant genera